Ryan Mark Scott (born 25 September 1995) is an American cricketer of Jamaican background, who plays as a batsman for the United States national cricket team. He made his Twenty20 International (T20I) debut on 22 December 2021, for the United States against Ireland.

References 

1995 births
Living people
American cricketers
United States Twenty20 International cricketers
Cricketers from Kingston, Jamaica
Jamaican emigrants to the United States
American sportspeople of Jamaican descent